Live on the Air is a live performance double CD by American jazz pianist Vince Guaraldi (credited to the Vince Guaraldi Trio), released November 14, 2008 through D & D Records (Guaraldi's label).

Background
Live on the Air consists of a live performance recorded on February 6, 1974 (two years to the day before Guaraldi's premature death), at Wally Heider Studios in San Francisco, California. The performance was broadcast live by radio stations KPFA and KPFB. Tracks 1-8 were performed for the original broadcast. The sound engineer then advised Guaraldi and his trio to  "play until your heart's content" (Track 9), resulting in three additional songs performed for the studio audience.

Track listing
Numerous errors were made with respect to song titles and running times. Proper titles and song lengths appear with incorrectly titled tracks in parenthesis.

"Cabaret", "Linus and Lucy" and "Cast Your Fate to the Wind" were previously released on North Beach (2006).

Personnel 
Credits adapted from CD liner notes.

Vince Guaraldi Trio
 Vince Guaraldi – piano, Fender Rhodes
 Seward McCain – electric bass
 Eliot Zigmund – drums

Additional
 Jesse Hayes – liner notes 
 Michael Graves – engineer (audio restoration)
 David Guaraldi – producer

References

External links 
 Live on the Air at Discogs

2008 live albums
Vince Guaraldi albums
Vince Guaraldi live albums
Peanuts music